The Servetus W. Ogan House is a historic house at 504 East Forrest Avenue in Wynne, Arkansas.  It is a two-story American Foursquare building, built out of rusticated concrete blocks in 1910.  It has a hip roof with hipped dormers, and a projecting single-story porch supported by square columns.  It is one of the city's few examples of residential concrete-block construction, a style that was briefly popular in the area.

The house was listed on the National Register of Historic Places in 2015.

See also
National Register of Historic Places listings in Cross County, Arkansas

References

Houses on the National Register of Historic Places in Arkansas
Queen Anne architecture in Arkansas
Houses completed in 1895
Houses in Cross County, Arkansas
National Register of Historic Places in Cross County, Arkansas